The Blackbeard Island National Wildlife Refuge is a  National Wildlife Refuge located in McIntosh county in Georgia. The refuge was established to provide a nature and forest preserve for aesthetic and conservation purposes.

The refuge is one of seven refuges administered by the Savannah Coastal Refuges Complex in Savannah, Georgia. The complex has a combined staff of 31 with the fiscal year 2005 budget of $3,582,000.

History 

The name of the island comes from Edward Teach, the infamous pirate Blackbeard. There is a legend that part of his treasure is buried on the island. There has never been a single doubloon found, though. The last hunt took place in the 1880s on the north end of the island. There have been no further authorized attempts since.

The land which is currently Blackbeard Island originally came from the Navy Department in 1800 in a public auction as a source of live oak timber for ship building. The island was then placed under the jurisdiction of the Bureau of Biological Survey to be maintained as a preserve and breeding ground for native wildlife and migratory birds in 1924. A presidential proclamation in 1940 changed its designation from Blackbeard Island Reservation to Blackbeard Island National Wildlife Refuge.

Topography 
Blackbeard island is accessible only by boat. Transportation to the island is not provided by the Fish and Wildlife Service. A public boat ramp on Harris Neck NWR (Barbour River Landing) may also be used as a launching site for trips to the island.

The island consists of interconnecting linear dunes thickly covered by oak/palmetto vegetation.

Wildlife and protected species 
The main objective of the refuge is to provide wintering habitat and protection for migratory birds. It is also to provide protection and management for endangered and threatened species such as the loggerhead sea turtle, American bald eagle, wood stork, and piping plover. Notable concentrations of waterfowl, wading birds, shorebirds, songbirds, raptors, deer, and alligators can be seen at various times of the year.

Facilities 
There is no visitor center at the refuge.

Parks on the Air
The Blackbeard Island National Wildlife Refuge was activated for Parks On The Air in 2023.

See also 
 List of National Wildlife Refuges

References

External links 
 Blackbeard Island National Wildlife Refuge

Landforms of McIntosh County, Georgia
National Wildlife Refuges in Georgia (U.S. state)
Protected areas established in 1924
Protected areas of McIntosh County, Georgia
Wetlands of Georgia (U.S. state)